Anders Lau (born 6 June 1953) is a Danish sports shooter. He competed in the men's 25 metre rapid fire pistol event at the 1996 Summer Olympics.

References

1953 births
Living people
Danish male sport shooters
Olympic shooters of Denmark
Shooters at the 1996 Summer Olympics